Rajendra Prasad Yadav  is an Indian politician. He was elected to the lower House of the Indian Parliament the Lok Sabha from Madhepura, Bihar as a member of the Indian National Congress.

References

External links
Official biographical sketch in Parliament of India website

Indian National Congress politicians
1937 births
Living people
India MPs 1971–1977
India MPs 1980–1984
Lok Sabha members from Bihar
Members of the Bihar Legislative Assembly
Indian National Congress (U) politicians
Janata Dal politicians
Indian National Congress politicians from Bihar